"My Propeller" is a song by the English indie rock band Arctic Monkeys. It was released as the third single from the band's third studio album Humbug, as announced on 1 February 2010. Released on 22 March 2010, the single follows its two predecessors from Humbug, "Crying Lightning" and "Cornerstone", with the 10" vinyl being sold exclusively at Oxfam charity stores.

The 10" version of the single features three new B-sides, with the 7" bringing one new B-side.

The video for the single was released on 18 March.

The song "Joining the Dots" was revealed during Alex Turner's visit to Little Noise Sessions.

Originally, Arctic Monkeys planned the third single to be "Pretty Visitors", but was switched to "My Propeller".

Track listing

Credits and personnel
Arctic Monkeys
Alex Turner – lead vocals, rhythm guitar, acoustic guitar , glockenspiel 
Jamie Cook – lead guitar, baritone guitar 
Nick O'Malley – bass guitar
Matt Helders – drums, percussion, vocals

Additional musicians
John Ashton – backing vocals, keyboards

Charts

References

2010 singles
2009 songs
Arctic Monkeys songs
Charity singles
Songs written by Alex Turner (musician)
Song recordings produced by James Ford (musician)
Songs written by Jamie Cook
Domino Recording Company singles